Ecbolium ligustrinum is also known as green ice crossandra, green shrimp plant, and turquoise crossandra. Its flowers may be green or blue in colour.

References

Acanthaceae